Daulat may refer to:
Daulat (painter), Mughal painter
Daulat (1949 film)
Daulat (1982 film)
Daulat (2020 film)
Daulat Beg Oldi, Indian military base in Ladakh

People with the given name
Daulat Khan Lodi, 16th-century governor of Lahore
Daulat Rao Sindhia, Maharaja of Gwalior (d. 1827)

See also 
 al-Dawla